Vintage NRPS is an album by the country rock group the New Riders of the Purple Sage.  It was recorded live on February 21 and February 23, 1971 at the Capitol Theater in Port Chester, New York, and released in 1986.

At the time of the Capitol Theatre shows, the New Riders of the Purple Sage were regularly performing as the opening act for the Grateful Dead.  Jerry Garcia was a member of both bands.  Garcia would play pedal steel guitar with the New Riders, then play electric guitar and sing with the Dead.  A Grateful Dead concert from the same set of shows as Vintage NRPS was released as the album Three from the Vault.

Track listing

All the songs were written by John Dawson, except "Honky Tonk Women" by Mick Jagger and Keith Richards.

"I Don't Know You" – 3:41
"Cecilia" – 4:13
"Whatcha Gonna Do" – 3:02
"Dirty Business" – 11:20
"Fair Chance to Know" – 4:10
"Garden of Eden" – 6:31
"Portland Woman" – 5:08
"Honky Tonk Women" – 5:29

Credits

New Riders of the Purple Sage

Jerry Garcia – pedal steel guitar
John Dawson – guitar, vocals
David Nelson – guitar, vocals
Dave Torbert – bass, vocals
Spencer Dryden – drums

Production

Engineer – David Luke
Producer – David Nelson
Cover painting – David Nelson
Back photo – Herb Greene
Graphics Assistance – Tim Harris, Dewey Reid – Fine Line Design
Color Separations – Summerfield Graphics

Notes

New Riders of the Purple Sage albums
1986 live albums
Relix Records live albums